1920 London is a 2016 Indian supernatural horror film directed by Tinu Suresh Desai. It is the third installment in the 1920 film series, after 1920 and 1920: The Evil Returns. The film stars Sharman Joshi, Meera Chopra, and Vishal Karwal in lead roles. The film managed to recover its cost and became a moderate success but it couldn't repeat the success of its previous installments, still it was followed by another installment titled 1921.

Plot 

The film opens with the life of Shivangi, the princess of a royal house in Sikar, Rajasthan, now living in London with her husband Kunwar Veer Singh. They are a happy couple until one day when Veer develops a minor illness that soon flares up into a disease, shrivelling his body and shrinking his head. Veer is hospitalized and his symptoms worsen – his body begins to contort unnaturally and he begins growling in strange languages. The doctors seem to diagnose it as tetanus, which is incurable. Shivangi is frightened; Veer is just not the same and Shivangi's handmaiden, Kesar Ma deems it black magic.

Kesar Ma thinks it is because Veer's father, the King, had two wives and the second wife wanted Veer, the heir, out of the way. The film moves to Rajasthan, where Shivangi and her family visit an exorcist to remedy Veer's condition. The exorcist attempts to confront the witch by entering the other realm through a mirror, but is soon expelled, being too weak to confront the witch. The exorcist refers the King to the most powerful spiritual master in the land, Mewar Baba, whose real name is Jai Singh Gujjar.

Shivangi shudders on hearing about Jai. Some years ago, she was deeply in love with Jai. Her uncle saw them together and attempted to blackmail her into sleeping with him. Jai stepped in between and fought off the uncle who promptly reported the matter to the King. Jai was charged with attempted murder. Shivangi inexplicably stood as witness against Jai and Jai was ultimately sent to jail for five years. Shivangi contacts Jai to help her save her husband. Jai flatly refuses, but Shivangi pleads to him for help and he finally agrees to go to London.

Jai investigates the matter and discovers that Veer's troubles began upon receiving a strange amulet as a gift from an unknown admirer in Rajasthan. The amulet transmitted the witch demon into Veer. Jai prepares Shivangi into reciting a spiritual chant to bind the witch to their mansion so that Jai can throw the locket into the Thames river, thereby freeing Veer. Shivangi maintains the chant over the witch's attempt to thwart it and Jai finishes the task. However, it is revealed that the amulet and the witch were dispatched by Jai himself, and as he prepares to leave London, Shivangi confronts him, asking him how he knows the source of the amulet. Jai admits his vengeance, saying that he wanted Veer dead. Shivangi reveals why she betrayed him years ago: When their affair was revealed, the King had ordered Jai to be killed. Shivangi had begged for his life and it was granted for the price of her betrayal. Now guilty and dismayed, Jai resolves to stay in London and free Veer from the witch.

Jai prepares his final assault on the witch. Jai invokes his own spiritual master through a letter. The master chastises Jai for acting in haste and then regretfully says that the witch will not leave without taking a soul. The master directs Jai to an abandoned church where he receives a set of charmed Celtic daggers. Jai prepares a charm to attack the witch. He enters the witch's realm through a mirror and recovers the amulet. The witch attacks ferociously and is about to stop Shivangi when Jai smashes the mirror, closing the portal and trapping himself in the realm, so Shivangi can burn the amulet and free her husband. Shivangi sees Jai smile peacefully from a last shattered piece of the mirror before it breaks as Veer comes to life. After two weeks, Veer and Shivangi find the letter of correspondence between Jai and his master. Jai had offered his soul so Veer could be freed. Veer is touched and places Jai's photograph upon his mantelpiece as the film ends.

Cast
 Sharman Joshi as Jai Singh Gujjar 
 Meera Chopra as Shivangi
 Vishal Karwal as Veer Singh
 Meenal Kapoor as Witch
 Gajendra Chauhan as Tantrik
 Sushmita Mukherjee as Kesar Maa
 Surendra Pal as (Raja) Shivangi's father

Reception
1920 London received generally negative reviews from critics. Koimoi.com gave the film 1.5/5 stars and wrote, "Where do we start? A lazy writing, poor direction and an even more unconvincing act!" Mohar Basu of The Times of India gave the film 1/5 stars and wrote,"There isn't an inkling of innovative thinking in the third installment of the 1920 series. The best thing that can be said about it is that it will remain one of the year's funniest films". Soumyata of Bollywood Life, also gave 1.5/5 stars to the film and wrote, "While film had a good twist post interval, it wasn't surprising. Except for the gender reversal, as here the wife is saving the husband, the plot is similar to the first 1920 film, Needless to say, the latest entry in the 1920 series disappoints big time, with Sharman Joshi being the only saving grace, Watch the film only if you don't have anything else to do". 

Manjusha of Gulf News gave 1.5/5 to the film and wrote,"Vikram Bhatt exhausts every cliché that has been regurgitated in Bollywood love stories. Corny dialogues such as "we will live together and die together" and sappy songs with lovers dancing around in picturesque locations will make you nauseous. While the first few scenes in which evil spirit unleashes her fury are startling, it gets tiring" .

Music

The music for 1920 London is composed by Shaarib-Toshi, and JAM8. The first song "Gumnaan Hai Koi" which was a recreated version of the original song from the 1965 film Gumnaam was released on 9 April 2016. The music rights of the film are acquired by T-Series except the "Gumnaam" song which is bought by Saregama. The full music album was released on 21 April 2016.

Sequel
A sequel of the film was announced in June 2016 by the makers. The film was titled 1921 and was released in 2018.

References

External links
 
 
 

Hindi-language horror films
2016 films
2016 horror films
2010s Hindi-language films
Indian supernatural horror films
Films set in London
Films set in 1920
Reliance Entertainment films